Dark radiation (also dark electromagnetism) is a postulated type of radiation that mediates interactions of dark matter.

By analogy to the way photons mediate electromagnetic interactions between particles in the Standard Model (called baryonic matter  in cosmology), dark radiation is proposed to mediate interactions between dark matter particles. Similar to dark matter particles, the hypothetical dark radiation does not interact with Standard Model particles.

There has been no notable evidence for the existence of such radiation, but since baryonic matter contains multiple interacting particle types, it is reasonable to suppose that dark matter does also. Moreover, it has been pointed out recently that the cosmic microwave background data seems to suggest that the number of effective neutrino degrees of freedom is more than 3.046, which is slightly more than the standard case for 3 types of neutrino. This extra degree of freedom could arise from having a non-trivial amount of dark radiation in the universe. One possible candidate for dark radiation is the sterile neutrino.

See also

References

Radiation
Dark matter
Dark concepts in astrophysics